Marielund may refer to:

Marielund, a village in Haparanda Municipality, Sweden
Marielund, a village in Strängnäs Municipality, Sweden
Marielund, a village in Uppsala County, Sweden
Marielund, a manor house located in Karlskrona Municipality, Sweden

See also
Marielund railway station, Upsala-Lenna Jernväg, Sweden